Michael R. Greenlay (born September 15, 1968) is a Brazilian-born Canadian former ice hockey goaltender. Greenlay played two games for the Edmonton Oilers in 1989–90. He was a successful amateur player who spent most of his pro career in the minor leagues.

Greenlay was born in Vitória, Brazil and raised in Calgary, Alberta.

Greenlay was selected 189th overall by Edmonton in 1986 out of the Calgary AAA Midgets. He then played parts of three years at Lake Superior State. He was a member of the Lake Superior State Lakers 1988 NCAA Championship men's ice hockey team. Early in the 1988–89 season he left the Lakers to suit up for the WHL's Saskatoon Blades. Greenlay helped the squad reach the Memorial Cup final and was named the top goaltender at the tournament and an all-star.

Apart from his two-game stint with Edmonton, Greenlay excelled for parts of two years with the AHL's Cape Breton Oilers. He also toiled in the ECHL and IHL before retiring early in the 1995–96 season. In 1994 Greenlay shared the James Norris Memorial Trophy (IHL) with J.C. Bergeron for allowing the fewest goals in the IHL. He also led all post-season goalies in wins while helping the Atlanta Knights win the Turner Cup in 1994.

Greenlay provided colour commentary for the Minnesota Wild until 2020 when he was released from his contract.

Career statistics

Regular season and playoffs

External links
 

1968 births
Living people
Atlanta Knights players
Anaheim Ducks announcers
Canadian ice hockey goaltenders
Cape Breton Oilers players
Edmonton Oilers draft picks
Edmonton Oilers players
Hershey Bears players
Houston Aeros (1994–2013) players
Knoxville Cherokees players
Lake Superior State Lakers men's ice hockey players
Louisville Icehawks players
Minnesota Wild announcers
National Hockey League broadcasters
NCAA men's ice hockey national champions
Penticton Knights players
People from Vitória, Espírito Santo
Saskatoon Blades players
Ice hockey people from Calgary
Brazilian sportspeople
Sportspeople from Espírito Santo